Center console or centre console may refer to:
Center console (automobile)
Center console (boat)